Sanyuanqiao, or Sanyuan Bridge is a major overpass on the northeastern stretch of Beijing's 3rd Ring Road. It was opened in 1984.

The overpass links three major passageways in Beijing and the complex structure made it a speciality on its own in its first days. The Airport Expressway, Jingshun Road (China National Highway 101) and the 3rd Ring Road were interlinked.

Originally, the Airport Expressway's position was the old airport road. Today, the old airport road has become a service, or auxiliary road, to the current Airport Expressway.

The simple complexity of the overpass was tempting to tamper with, but in the 1990s, the temptation was too much (caused by excess traffic): another portion of a flyover was built for vehicles heading from the eastern 3rd Ring Road to interlink directly with the Airport Expressway.

This bridge also lends its name to this entire region of Beijing, one of the few (another one being Sihui Bridge, providing the name for Sihui Station and its surroundings) bridges in Beijing to do so.

At Sanyuanqiao, there is also a Beijing Subway station. Line 10 and the Airport Express stop at Sanyuanqiao Station.

Road transport in Beijing
Bridges in Beijing
Bridges completed in 1984
1984 establishments in China